 

This is a list of all the episodes of The Trap Door. The claymation animated television series began in 1986 and ended in 1990, running for two series of 25 and 15 episodes.

All 40 episodes are now available on a single DVD released February 21, 2005.

Summary

Series 1 (1986)

Series 2 (1990)
Note: All series 2 episodes of the Trap Door still ended as copyright in 1986.

Notes

References
 Episode Guide at 80s Cartoons (copied from the DVD insert which contains a few minor errors)

Trap Door